This is a list of seasons played by Hapoel Ra'anana Football Club in Israeli and European football, from 1939–40 (when the club first competed in the league) to the most recent completed season. It details the club's achievements in major competitions, and the top scorers for each season. Top scorers in bold were also the top scorers in the Israeli league that season. Records of minor competitions such as the Lilian Cup are not included due to them being considered of less importance than the State Cup and the Toto Cup.

History
Hapoel Ra'anana was established in 1938 and played in the second division until relegating at the end of the 1955–56 season. The club played three further seasons in the second division in the late 1960s before spending its time in the lower divisions for the next decades. In 2001 the club returned to the second division. In 2009 the club was promoted for the first time to the top division, as the Premier League was expanded to 16 clubs. The club relegated after a season at the top division, but after three seasons was promoted again to the top division.

Seasons

Key

 P = Played
 W = Games won
 D = Games drawn
 L = Games lost
 F = Goals for
 A = Goals against
 Pts = Points
 Pos = Final position

 Leumit = Liga Leumit (National League)
 Artzit = Liga Artzit (Nationwide League)
 Premier = Liga Al (Premier League)
 Pal. League = Palestine League

 F = Final
 Group = Group stage
 QF = Quarter-finals
 QR1 = First Qualifying Round
 QR2 = Second Qualifying Round
 QR3 = Third Qualifying Round
 QR4 = Fourth Qualifying Round
 RInt = Intermediate Round

 R1 = Round 1
 R2 = Round 2
 R3 = Round 3
 R4 = Round 4
 R5 = Round 5
 R6 = Round 6
 SF = Semi-finals

Notes

References

Hapoel Ra'anana A.F.C.
 
Hapoel Ra'anana